Frank Dunin (born 29 June 1935) is a former Australian rules footballer who played with Richmond in the Victorian Football League (VFL).

Frank usually played in key positions including centre-half-forward and centre-half-back. Recruited from the Amateurs he spent six seasons at Richmond before he was forced to retire at the age of 24, due to a knee injury.

Frank's highlight of his career was being selected in the 1956 Olympic demonstration game representing the VFL side. He was best on ground for the losing side kicking 3 goals at centre half forward. His jumper from that day remains in the Richmond museum.

Once he retired he became actively involved in coaching. He coached a total of five Premiership sides as well as leading the Victorian Amateurs to victory in the 1967 Australian Amateur Carnival. He has also been involved with the Manuka and Southern Districts Clubs, in the ACT, as both a committeeman and selector. 

Away from football, Frank holds a Degree in Agricultural Science is now a leading scientist in this field in Australia. He is also involved in producing scientific related publications and now lives in Benalla.

See also
 Australian football at the 1956 Summer Olympics

Notes

External links 
		
		
Tigerland Archives

Living people
1935 births
Australian rules footballers from Victoria (Australia)
Richmond Football Club players
University Blacks Football Club players